Kai Lenny (born October 8, 1992) is an American professional big wave surfer, stand-up paddle (SUP) surfer and racer, surfer, tow-in surfer, windsurfer, kitesurfer, wing foiler and celebrity watersports enthusiast.  Lenny lives on Maui.

Career 
Lenny achieved recognition in 2012 with first place at the Hawaii Island Finals SUP pro, and first place at the Sunset Beach SUP pro.

Kai Lenny claimed the SUP racing world champion title when he won the seasons finals of the first Standup World Series championship races held at Turtle Bay Resort, O'ahu, Hawaii on 13–14 September 2012.

In February of 2020 Lenny won the Nazaré Tow Surfing Challenge, at Praia do Norte, in Portugal. The contest ran in massive waves and included the participation of the best big wave riders in the world.

He is also known for big beach clean-ups in Hawaii.

Kai is a Red Bull athlete.

Personal life 
Lenny is engaged to marry Maui-based interior designer Molly Payne. The couple recently announced the gender of their expected twins. Kai let the world know that Molly is carrying girls by surfing his home wave, Peahi (Jaws) with pink smoke.

References

1992 births
Living people
People from Paia, Hawaii
Windsurfers
Big wave surfers
American kitesurfers
Male kitesurfers
World Surf League surfers